International Communist League may refer to:

A number of Trotskyist parties:
 Internationalist Communist League (Brazil)
 International Communist League (Fourth Internationalist), also known as the Spartacist League
 International Communist League (Mexico), which joined the Workers' Revolutionary Party in 1976
 Internationalist Communist League (Portugal)
 International Communist League (Vietnam), active from 1944 until about 1946
 International-Communist League, a short-lived alliance of British groups in the mid-1970s
 Left Opposition, led by Trotsky from 1933 until 1936
 Pathfinder tendency, sometimes referred to as the International Communist League
 International Communist League (Marxist–Leninist–Maoist), a Marxist–Leninist–Maoist international

See also 
 Communist League (disambiguation)
 ICL (disambiguation)